Bobby Torrance (born 12 August 1958) is a Scottish footballer.

External links 

1958 births
Living people
Scottish footballers
Association football forwards
St Mirren F.C. players
Hibernian F.C. players
Partick Thistle F.C. players
Stirling Albion F.C. players
Brechin City F.C. players
Arbroath F.C. players
Alloa Athletic F.C. players
Scottish Football League players